Rene Jacob Yougbara  (born 31 December 1983 in  Bobo-Dioulasso, Hauts-Bassins, Burkina Faso) is a Burkinabe swimmer. He competed at the 2008 Summer Olympics.

External links
Rene Yougbare at Sports Reference

References

Living people
Swimmers at the 2008 Summer Olympics
Burkinabé male swimmers
Olympic swimmers of Burkina Faso
1983 births
People from Bobo-Dioulasso
21st-century Burkinabé people